Sir Nicholas Roderick O'Conor  ( 1843 – 19 March 1908) was an Anglo-Irish diplomat.  When he died, Sir Nicholas was the British Ambassador to Turkey.

Early life
He was born, the youngest of three sons, to Patrick A. C. O'Conor and Jane French, into a cadet branch of the Catholic O'Conor Don family of County Roscommon. He was raised on his family estate Dun Dermot on the Roscommon-County Galway border. He was educated at Stonyhurst College.

Career 

O'Conor entered the diplomatic service in 1866.  In his early years, he was attached to the Embassy in Berlin, achieving the rank of Third Secretary in 1870. He served as Secretary at the Hague, Madrid. Rio de Janeiro, and Paris. He was trained in the diplomatic service by Richard Lyons, 1st Viscount Lyons, and was a member of the Tory-sympathetic 'Lyons School' of British diplomacy. He was Secretary and Chargé d'Affaires at Peking and Washington, Political Agent and Consul-General in Bulgaria.

Head of Mission
O'Conor's first ministerial appointment was at the British Legation at Peking.
 1892: In Seoul, O'Conor was the British Minister to the Empire of Korea.
 1895: In St. Petersburg, he was Ambassador of His Britannic Majesty in the Imperial court of the Russian Czar.
 1898: In Constantinople, he was Ambassador to the Court of the Sublime Porte of the Ottoman Empire.

In 1896, O'Conor was made a Privy Counsellor.

O'Conor died in Constantinople following hemorrhage of the stomach. He was the first British Ambassador to die in post in Turkey since Sir Edward Barton, Ambassador of Queen Elizabeth I to Sultan Mehmet III, died in 1598 at the Panagia Apsinthiotissa (now in Cyprus).

Family
He was married to Minna Margaret Hope-Scott, daughter of James Robert Hope-Scott, Q.C. (1812–1873) and Lady Victoria Hope-Scott (1840–1870). They had three daughters:

His eldest daughter Fearga Victoria Mary O'Conor (b. 1892, d. 22 Mar 1969) married Rear-Admiral Malcolm Raphael Joseph Constable-Maxwell-Scott, son of Hon. Joseph Constable-Maxwell-Scott and Mary Monica Hope-Scott, on 6 September 1918. She died on 22 March 1969. They had three children.
1. Sir Michael Fergus Constable-Maxwell-Scott, 13th Bt. of the Constable Maxwell-Scott baronets (b. 23 Jul 1921, d. 29 Nov 1989)
2. Elizabeth Mary Constable-Maxwell-Scott (b. 28 May 1924, d. 1991)
3. Ian Malcolm Constable-Maxwell-Scott (b. 18 July 1927, d. 27 November 1993)

His second daughter, Muriel Margaret Minna O'Conor (b. 1894) married Charles Joseph Nevile, son of Ralph Henry Christopher Nevile, on 21 April 1919.

In 1918, at the Brompton Oratory, his youngest daughter Eileen Winifred Madeleine O'Conor (1897-1963) married Prince Matyla Ghyka (1881–1965) of Romania.

Arms

References

External links 

 The Papers of Sir Nicholas and Lady (Minna) O'Conor held at Churchill Archives Centre

People from County Roscommon
Irish diplomats
1843 births
1908 deaths
Ambassadors of the United Kingdom to Korea
Ambassadors of the United Kingdom to the Ottoman Empire
Ambassadors of the United Kingdom to Russia
Knights Grand Cross of the Order of the Bath
Knights Grand Cross of the Order of St Michael and St George
Nicholas Roderick
Members of the Privy Council of the United Kingdom
People educated at St Stanislaus College